Jamila Jaye Woods (born July 9, 1963) is an American pastor and politician who is a member of the Maryland House of Delegates for District 26 in Prince George's County, Maryland.

Background
Woods was born in Chesilhurst, New Jersey. She graduated from Howard University, earning a Bachelor of Arts degree in political science in 1990 and a Master of Divinity degree in 1999. She later attended the University of Maryland, Baltimore, where she earned a Master of Science degree in social work in 2002.

Since 2012, Woods has been the pastor of the Jabez Christian Community Church in White Plains, Maryland. She was the pastor of the Cornerstone African Methodist Episcopal Church in La Plata, Maryland from 2005 to 2012.

In 2018, Woods unsuccessfully ran for the Maryland Senate in District 26, losing to former state delegate Obie Patterson in the Democratic primary with 41.9 percent of the vote. In April 2021, she graduated from the Maryland People's Leadership Institute, a campaign training program organized by Progressive Maryland. In 2022, Woods ran for the Maryland House of Delegates in District 26, running on a slate with former state senator C. Anthony Muse, state delegate Kris Valderrama, and Kendal Wade, a funeral home operator. She won the Democratic primary on July 19, coming in third place behind incumbent state delegates Veronica L. Turner and Valderrama with 17.2 percent of the vote.

In the legislature 
Woods was sworn into the Maryland House of Delegates on January 11, 2023. She is a member of the House Health and Government Operations Committee.

Personal life
Woods has two children.

Electoral history

References

External links
 

1963 births
21st-century African-American women
21st-century African-American politicians
21st-century American politicians
21st-century American women politicians
African-American state legislators in Maryland
African-American women in politics
Democratic Party members of the Maryland House of Delegates
Howard University alumni
Living people
Politicians from Camden, New Jersey
University of Maryland, Baltimore alumni
Women state legislators in Maryland